Michel Kiesgen (born 15 September 1933) is a Luxembourgian gymnast. He competed in eight events at the 1960 Summer Olympics.

References

1933 births
Living people
Luxembourgian male artistic gymnasts
Olympic gymnasts of Luxembourg
Gymnasts at the 1960 Summer Olympics
Sportspeople from Luxembourg City
20th-century Luxembourgian people